Reaching for the World  is the fifth album by American vocal group Harold Melvin & the Blue Notes. This, their debut album for the ABC Records label, was recorded in 1976 and released in 1977. This is the first album without Teddy Pendergrass, David Ebo was his replacement. Also joining the Blue Notes were Dwight Johnson and William Spratley. On release it reached #56 in the US Billboard 200 and #15 in the US R&B Charts. The lead single was "Reaching For The World" which reached #74 in the US Billboard 100 and #6 in the US R&B Charts. Then "After You Love Me, Why Do You Leave Me", which featured Sharon Paige, reached #102 in the US Billboard 100 and #15 in the US R&B Charts. Hostage Parts 1&2 was chosen as the final single, but failed to chart.

Track listing

Side 1
"Reaching for the World" (Derek Floyd) – 4:24
"Where There’s a Will - There’s a Way" (Harold J. Melvin, Melvin Steele, Mervin Steele) – 4:04
"After You Love Me, Why Do You Leave Me" (Harold J. Melvin, Kenny Gamble) – 4:42
"Sandman" (Hubert V. Yarborough) – 4:25

Side 2
"Hostage Part 1 & 2" (Hubert V. Yarborough) – 6:30
"He Loves You and I Do Too" (Harold J. Melvin) – 3:37
"Big Singing Star" (Harold J. Melvin) - 3:33
"Stay Together" (John Whitehead, Gene McFadden, Victor Carstarphen) – 5:00

Production

Producer: Harold Melvin for Million Dollar Records
Recorded at Sigma Sound Studios, Philadelphia
Engineers: Jim Gallagher and Art Stoppe
Assistant Engineers: Peter Humphreys, Jeffrey Stewart, Carla Bandini and Jim Dougherty
Album Art Direction: Frank Mulvey and Earl Klasky
Album Design: Stan Evenson

References

External links
 

1977 albums
Harold Melvin & the Blue Notes albums
ABC Records albums
Albums recorded at Sigma Sound Studios